Wendy Richardson, OAM (born 1933) is one of Australia's most popular playwrights, best known as the author of Windy Gully. Richardson lives in Mount Kembla near Wollongong, New South Wales. She is very active in the local community, working with disabled and disadvantaged youth, assisting those in need, teaching Sunday School and participating in historical and literary events.

Richardson describes herself:

Biography

Richardson was born in Singleton in the Hunter Region, New South Wales, on 21 December 1933. In 1967 she moved to the small mining village of Mount Kembla in the Illawarra District, where she raised her children, working as a primary school teacher. In 1985 she commenced studying English Literature at the University of Wollongong, where she was to gain a Bachelor of Arts Degree.

Richardson describes her association with Mount Kembla:

Windy Gully
It was while studying at Wollongong University that Richardson wrote her first play, Windy Gully, which was commissioned and performed by the Theatre South Regional Theatre Company, directed by Des Davis, in 1987. The subject of Windy Gully is the mine disaster which took place at Mount Kembla on 31 July 1902, in which 96 men and boys lost their lives. Every family who lived in the village lost a relative. In many families, fathers and sons died. The bodies were buried in Wollongong Cemetery, Mount Kembla Cemetery and in an unmarked communal grave near a cricket field in Windy Gully.  In describing how she came to write the play, Richardson said:

Windy Gully proved very popular, going on interstate tour of mining towns in Queensland and New South Wales and being performed at the New Theatre in Sydney in 1989. There was a third season at Theatre South in 2000. Windy Gully was published in 1989 by Currency Press. Des Davis writes of Windy Gully: 

The anniversary of the disaster is commemorated annually with a church service at the Mount Kembla Soldiers and Miners Memorial Church, a parade and Mining Festival. Richardson was later to serve on the committee to organise the Mount Kembla Mining Disaster Centenary Commemoration in 2002. Songs from Windy Gully are published at the Mount Kembla Mining Heritage website and Illawarra Unity the journal of the Illawarra Branch of the Australian Society for the Study of Labour History.

Windy Gully was followed by Slacky Flat written in 1988, which toured the South Eastern Region of New South Wales and was performed at Theatre South and at the Regional Theatre Festival in Penrith.

Success

Richardson went on to write many more plays and monologues, all performed but many not published.  Des Davis writes in the foreword to Three Illawarra Plays:

The backgrounds include World War II, in the case of Lights out, Nellie Martin  and the Depression in Slacky Flat.  The Last Voyage of the Gracie Anne looks at community issues within the local fishing industry.  ... That Christmas of '75. is a backyard farce set against the sacking of Prime Minister Gough Whitlam by the Governor-General. John Senczuk writes of "...the overwhelming positive reception of the plays ...as positive and 'life-affirming'".

Richardson's skills as a dramatist have been greatly appreciated by Theatre South, not only because of their "box office magic", but also because Wendy knows how to write for a small group of players and is particularly skilled at monologue. Des Davis writes of Richardson's plays "They are, moreover, constantly innovative in structure, style, and in the use of other theatrical and literary devices."
Unfortunately Theatre South, for whom so many of Wendy's plays were written closed in 2003.

Des Davis writes "She is more popular in the Illawarra than David Williamson and Shakespeare."

Richardson says:

Awards
Richardson was nominated for a Sydney Theatre Critics Circle Award in 1989 and was awarded an Australian Arts Council Literary Fellowship in 1990.
In 2005 Richardson was awarded the Order of Australia Medal for her services to the Arts and to the Community, and in 2006 she was honoured in the Illawarra Australia Day Awards for her contribution to the Arts. Her plays have also been produced by the Riverina Theatre Company and heard on ABC Radio. She was made a lifetime member of Theatre South and the South Coast Writers' Centre.

Performed Works

For Theatre South-
 Windy Gully (1987)
 Slacky Flat (1988)
 On the Coal (1988)
 Lights Out, Nellie Martin  (1990)
 The Last Voyage of the Gracie Anne (1993)
 ...That Christmas of '75 (1995)
 Vida (1996)
 Alma and Ivy, Molly and Merle (1997)
 The Season of Emily Jane (1999)
 This Other Eden (2001) The Season of Emily Jane and This Other Eden are two parts of a trilogy.
 Soft Target (2002)
 Horse Shoe Bend  (1992) –  for Maitland Repertory Society
 Alma  (1993) –  for Sydney Festival and Carnivale
 Under the House  (1993)-  for the Faculty of Creative Arts, University of Wollongong.
 Valerie Paterson –  Where can She Live? (1995)- for The Illawarra Christian Performing Arts Company
 The Year 2000– Coming, Ready or Not  (1999) – for Community Group Recreation Illawarra
 The script for the re-enactment of the landing of the "Tom Thumb" at Towradgi –  for the Wollongong City Council Heritage Committee.
 The soundscape for the Bulli Miner's cottage – for the Bulli Miner's Cottage Committee
 Four Kembla Women, a monologue (2006) –  for the launch of Heritage Week in the Illawarra

Reference

Published works
 Windy Gully, Currency Press, (1989), .
 Three Illawarra Plays, Australian Playwright Signature Series, University of Wollongong, (1997),

See also

 Mining in Australia
 Order of Australia

References

External links
 Mount Kembla Mining Heritage Committee
 Mount Kembla History
 South Coast Writers Centre
 Coalfaces Project

Australian women dramatists and playwrights
1933 births
Living people
Recipients of the Medal of the Order of Australia
University of Wollongong alumni
20th-century Australian dramatists and playwrights
21st-century Australian dramatists and playwrights
21st-century Australian women writers
20th-century Australian women writers